Introducing Me was a song recorded by Nick Jonas for the Camp Rock 2: The Final Jam soundtrack.

Background and composition

In 2009, Nick Jonas recorded the song for the Camp Rock 2: The Final Jam soundtrack. His character Nate performs the song to Dana (actress Chloe Bridges) who plays Nick’s love interest in Camp Rock 2.
On August 6, 2010 was released in the UK.

"Introducing Me" was also released in 2010 on the karaoke video game Disney Sing It: Party Hits.

Critical reception
On November 10, 2010, singer Jason Mraz admits in an interview that the Camp Rock 2 tune "Introducing Me" sounds a lot like his song "I'm Yours". He also said: "I heard the song, and it was just a tremendous, tremendous horror of a tune," he said. "I noticed a few similarities in the melody, but it wasn't enough to pick up the phone and argue with somebody about it. If anything, I just wanted my $1.29 back that I spent on iTunes".

Track listing
Digital Download
"Introducing Me" - 3:07

Live performances
Jonas performed the song live for the first time during the Jonas Brothers Live In Concert tour on August 7, 2010. At select venues during the tour he tried to play the song faster each time. His record was under 2 minutes.
 
He also performed the song live on July 1, 2011 during the Microsoft Store Grand Opening in Century City. 
The song was also performed live after "Gotta Find You" during the concerts of the Nick Jonas 2011 Tour.
On May 16, 2012 he performed the song on General D. Chappie James Middle School of Science in New York, during a surprise visit.

On July 13, 2013 the song was performed again as part of the setlist of the Jonas Brothers Live Tour. It was performed again on August 3.

Chart performance
The song entered the Canadian Billboard Hot 100 at number 66 on the week ending September 26, 2012 and climbed the next week to number 53.
That week the song entered the US Billboard Hot 100 at number 92.

Charts

Personnel
Credits for Camp Rock 2: The Final Jam Soundtrack:

Nick Jonas - Lead Vocals
Jamie Houston - Producer, Mixer, Songwriter

Release history

References

2010 songs
Nick Jonas songs
Pop ballads
Camp Rock
Walt Disney Records singles
Songs written by Jamie Houston (songwriter)